Lorenzo Perini (born 22 July 1994) is an Italian hurdler who won a gold medal at the 2018 Mediterranean Games.

Biography

During his career he won three medals at youth level and three times the national championships. He is engaged to the hurdler Luminosa Bogliolo.

Achievements
Senior level

Personal bests
110 metres hurdles: 13.46 ( Naples, 12 July 2019)
60 metres hurdles: 7.66 ( Mondeville, 2 February 2019)

National titles
He won five times the national championship.
 Italian Athletics Championships
 110 metres hurdles: 2017, 2018
Italian Athletics Indoor Championships
 600 metres hurdles: 2016, 2019, 2020

See also
 Italian all-time lists - 100 metres hurdles
 Italy at the 2018 Mediterranean Games

References

External links
 

1994 births
Living people
Italian male hurdlers
Athletes (track and field) at the 2018 Mediterranean Games
Mediterranean Games gold medalists for Italy
Athletics competitors of Centro Sportivo Aeronautica Militare
Athletes from Milan
Mediterranean Games medalists in athletics
Mediterranean Games gold medalists in athletics
Italian Athletics Championships winners